Conquest of Space is a Canadian science television miniseries which aired on CBC Television in 1969.

Premise
Percy Saltzman hosted this Ottawa-produced series which concerned the history of travel in outer space. Emphasis was given to the years since 1957 when the Soviet Union launched Sputnik 1 and covered the American space program whose Apollo 11 successfully placed people on the moon a week before this series' debut. Footage from Britain, France, the Soviet Union and the United States was combined with interviews of scientists and engineers who were engaged in outer space programs.

Scheduling
This hour-long series was broadcast on Sundays at 10:00 p.m. (Eastern) from 27 July to 31 August 1969.

Episodes
 27 July 1969: "Sounds of Silence"
 3 August 1969: "The Other Side of the Sky"
 10 August 1969: "The High Frontier"
 17 August 1969: "A Star to Steer Her By"
 31 August 1969: "Childhood's End"

References

External links
 

CBC Television original programming
1969 Canadian television series debuts
1969 Canadian television series endings
Television shows filmed in Ottawa